KWLC (1240 AM) is a college radio station.  The station's programming consists primarily of music, but also includes sports, religious services, and educational content.  In September 2015, KWLC added a Sunday afternoon news program.  Licensed to Decorah, Iowa, United States.  The station is currently owned by Luther College and operated by a staff of Luther students.

The station began broadcasting in 1926 and is said to be the oldest continually operating radio station in Iowa. It broadcasts on a frequency shared with local commercial station KDEC. In 2004, the station began webcasting.

References

External links
FCC timeshare documentation

WLC
Radio stations established in 1926